Pascal Zbinden (born 18 February 1974) is a Swiss football goalkeeper who played for FC Lausanne-Sport.

External links
Pascal Zbinden at playmakerstats.com (English version of calciozz.it)

1974 births
FC Lausanne-Sport players
Living people
Swiss men's footballers
Association football goalkeepers